Sin Killer is a historical novel by American writer Larry McMurtry. It is the first, both in chronological and publishing order, of The Berrybender Narratives. Set in 1832, it follows the adventures of a clan of eccentric British aristocrats and their retainers as they begin a hunting expedition up the Missouri River.

The title refers to the nickname given to frontiersman Jim Snow, a Berrybender ally who violently hates sin of all kinds.

2002 American novels
Novels by Larry McMurtry
Historical novels
Fiction set in 1832
Novels set in the 1830s
The Berrybender Narratives
Missouri River